Manuel José Fuenmayor Berra (born 3 December 1980) is a Venezuelan former javelin thrower who competed in the 2004 Summer Olympics.

Achievements

External links 
 
 

1980 births
Living people
Venezuelan male javelin throwers
Olympic athletes of Venezuela
Athletes (track and field) at the 2004 Summer Olympics
Central American and Caribbean Games gold medalists for Venezuela
Competitors at the 2002 Central American and Caribbean Games
Central American and Caribbean Games medalists in athletics
Athletes (track and field) at the 2003 Pan American Games
Pan American Games competitors for Venezuela
20th-century Venezuelan people
21st-century Venezuelan people